Don't Make Me Angry  is a British documentary series for the Channel Four  by John Walsh of Walsh Bros Ltd. Each episode featured a story of anger and how its triggers and results were stopping the teenagers and their families from having a normal life. Shot in an observational documentary style, the psychologist Rachel Andrew provided the on screen advice.

Episodes Series One
There have been 5 screenings of this series on Channel Four from 2005 to 2009 below are the details for the first UK transmissions.

Episodes Series Two
There have been 10 screenings of this series on Channel Four from 2006 to 2009 below are the details for the first UK transmissions.

Awards
In 2006 the series was nominated for a BAFTA.

Series two won the World Medal Young Adult Special at the New York Television Festival Awards.

Reception
One episode was listed by the Children and Young People Now website.

References

External links

2000s British documentary television series
2005 British television series debuts
2006 British television series endings
Social realism
Works about psychiatry
Channel 4 documentary series
British television documentaries